Ivan Taranov (born 30 October 1994) is a Russian racing driver.

Career

Karting
Born in Tolyatti, Taranov began karting in 2010, finishing eighth in the Daytona Max Lightweight Sprint Series.

Formula Renault
In 2011, Taranov moved into open-wheel racing, competing in Formula Renault BARC with Daytona Motorsport. He ended the season fourteenth, finishing in ten out of the series' twelve races.

Taranov remained in the series for the 2012 season, but switched to Antel Motorsport. He improved to tenth place in the series standings with just one retirement in fourteen races.

After competing for Scorpio Motorsport in the final round of the 2012 season, Taranov signed with the team for the 2013 season. He missed the rounds at Croft and Rockingham due to funding issues, but returned for the finale at Silverstone, where he scored his first wins in the series. He also competed in four races of the Formula Renault 2.0 Alps series with Tech 1 Racing.

GP3 Series
In 2014, Taranov will graduate to the GP3 Series with Hilmer Motorsport supported by Force India F1 Team.

Racing record

Career summary

References

External links

1994 births
Living people
Russian racing drivers
Sportspeople from Tolyatti
Formula Renault BARC drivers
Italian Formula Renault 2.0 drivers
Formula Renault 2.0 Alps drivers
Russian GP3 Series drivers
Tech 1 Racing drivers
Hilmer Motorsport drivers